Sharp Shooter is a 2015 Indian Kannada-language action comedy film written and directed by Ghouse Peer in his directorial debut. It stars Diganth and Sangeeta Chauhan in the lead roles. The supporting cast features Chikkanna, Lakshmi, Sudharani, Bhajarangi Lokesh, Achyuth Kumar and Rangayana Raghu.

Plot 
Sharp Shooter is a cocktail story with mixture of various elements such as love, drama, action and romance. The story revolves around a boy named JK and a girl named Nandhini. They end up falling in love with each other. However, they end up having a hard time trying to accept each other.

Cast 
 Diganth as Jedara Kannappa alias J K
 Sangeeta Chauhan as Nandini
 Chikkanna
 Lakshmi
 Achyuth Kumar
 Daniel Kuttappa
 Saurav Lokesh 
 Sudharani
 Sathyajith
 Rangayana Raghu
 Mithra
 Tumkur Mohan
 Sardar Satya
 Aindrita Ray in a special appearance in song "Kuntebille"

Production 
The film was a debut for Ghouse Peer as a director who had earlier worked in Kannada cinema as a lyricist. He wrote the story and screenplay for Sharpshooter. Following speculations about the female lead after having signed Diganth to play the male lead, Sangeetha Chauhan, a Mumbai based model was signed. Reports in September 2014 said Aindrita Ray would be making a cameo appearance in a song in the film.

Filming 
The film was launched with a muhuratam shot on 25 June 2014 in Bangalore. At the film launch, the makers stated the filming would begin on 2 July 2014 in Mysore, with a few action sequences. The makers also revealed the filming would then take place in Bangalore, Dubai, followed by song sequences in Europe. Filming completed in late-November 2014.

Soundtrack 

M. S. Shiva Santhosh composed the film score and its soundtrack, lyrics for which was penned by Ghouse Peer, Chikkanna and Sridhar. The soundtrack album consists of six tracks.

Track listing

References

External links 
 

2015 films
Indian action comedy films
2010s Kannada-language films
2015 action comedy films
Films shot in Mysore
Films shot in Bangalore
Films shot in Dubai
Films about murder
Indian courtroom films
Indian serial killer films
2015 directorial debut films
2015 comedy films